The 2013 St. George Illawarra Dragons season was the 15th in the joint venture club's history. Coached by Steve Price and captained by Ben Creagh, they competed in the National Rugby League's 2013 Telstra Premiership. This season was the worst year performance wise since the joint venture was created. They finished only over the top of Wests Tigers & the Parramatta Eels.

The Dragons started the season losing their first 3 games to Melbourne Storm, Brisbane Broncos & Canberra Raiders only to come back and win their next 3 over Cronulla Sharks, Newcastle Knights & Wests Tigers. The Knights win coming at a cost, with the injury of New Zealand international Gerard Beale for the season. Unfortunately for the Dragons those were the only wins they could string together in 2013 losing another 3 to the Sydney Roosters, the Manly-Warringah Sea Eagles and the Gold Coast Titans.

Round 10 saw a glimmering light at the end of the tunnel for the Dragons when they signed former Canberra Raiders superstar Josh Dugan. Dugan was seen as the answer to the fullback spot left by the injured Beale. He kicked off his career at the joint venture scoring 2 tries in the team's romp of the Parramatta Eels 32-12 at WIN Stadium.

The next week the Dragons were sent back to earth with a thud as they became the first St. George Dragons / St. George Illawarra Dragons team to be kept to nil at Jubilee Oval as the Penrith Panthers ran in 3 unanswered tries to win 19-0. This was followed by a loss to the Canterbury-Bankstown Bulldogs by 2 points. This was the last game for the club's all time leading point scorer Jamie Soward for the Dragons as he was dumped out of the side and two weeks later released to join the London Broncos of the Super League.

Over the month of June the Dragons 3-1 record with only a solitary win of the Newcastle Knights in Newcastle, Josh Dugan again scoring 2 tries.

July started disastrously for the Red V again being kept to nil by the Sydney Roosters, losing 36-0. After this night the Dragons had to win almost every remaining game to stay in the final hunt. Round 17 saw first v 2nd last as the Dragons played the South Sydney Rabbitohs away at ANZ Stadium with the Dragons showing true grit to score twice in 10 mins to bring the game into extra time. Brett Morris getting the winning try in golden point extra time.

However the Dragons then went on a streak that was etched in the club's history books, losing their next 6 games, including the 2 teams below them on the points table, an embarrassing loss to Wests Tigers and the Parramatta Eels. Four of those six games were lost by 4 points or less, including a heart-stopping loss to the Cronulla-Sutherland Sharks where Sharks player Andrew Fifita scored on the buzzer to win the local derby after trailing the whole game.

In the last game of the year the Red V said goodbye to some legends of the game including Matt Cooper (rugby league), Nathan Fien and Michael Weyman. The 17 on the field, scoring an impressive 19-10 win over the New Zealand Warriors who needed a win to keep their finals hopes alive.

Squad

Transfers
New Signings
Josh Drinkwater from Manly-Warringah Sea Eagles
Gerard Beale from Brisbane Broncos
Bronson Harrison from Canberra Raiders
Taioalo Vaivai from Parramatta Eels 
Tyson Frizell from Cronulla-Sutherland Sharks
Harry Siejka from New Zealand Warriors
Josh Dugan Free Agent from Round 10

Transfers/leaving
Jack Buchanan to Wests Tigers
David Gower to Manly-Warringah Sea Eagles
Ben Hornby Retired
Denan Kemp to Brisbane Broncos
Jeremy Latimore to Penrith Panthers
Jake Marketo to Redcliffe Dolphins
Josh Miller Retired
Dean Young Retired
Beau Scott to Newcastle Knights
Jamie Soward Released from Round 12

Ladder

References

St. George Illawarra Dragons seasons
St. George Illawarra Dragons season